The HP Compaq TC4200 is a Tablet PC that was released on March 1, 2005 and has since been discontinued. It is believed to be the successor to the TC1100, which was discontinued in Q4 of 2005. The TC4200 boasted many powerful features that could be found on mid to high-range laptops and competing tablets during its production. The TC4200 was superseded by the similar HP Compaq TC4400.

Specifications

More extensive specs list

Further reading
 CNet.com Review
 Maintenance and Service Guide HP Compaq tc4200 Tablet PC

Compaq Tc4200
Microsoft Tablet PC